Parr Reservoir or Parr Shoals Reservoir is an impoundment of the Broad River in Pomaria, South Carolina.  It is the last dam on the Broad River before the river reaches Columbia, South Carolina, and the Columbia Canal. The lake is mainly used as a holding pond of sorts, as the water is pulled in and out and used to cool the turbines of a nearby nuclear power plant. Some anglers will fish for catfish in the main river channel, while bass fishing is mainly held back to Heller's and Cannon creeks, as well as the tailrace below Lake Monticello.

See also
List of lakes in South Carolina

References

External links

Protected areas of Newberry County, South Carolina
Protected areas of Fairfield County, South Carolina
Reservoirs in South Carolina
Bodies of water of Newberry County, South Carolina
Bodies of water of Fairfield County, South Carolina